Jean Pambrun (25 December 1929 – 18 July 2006) was a French rugby league player who represented France in the 1954 World Cup. His usual position was second row. He was born in Mérilheu and died in Cabestany.

Playing career 
Pambrun played for Marseille and then, for XIII Catalan, and made his debut for France in the 1953–54 European Rugby League Championship. He later played in the 1954 Rugby League World Cup. He was capped for France between 1953 and 1957.

References 

1929 births
2006 deaths
Sportspeople from Hautes-Pyrénées
France national rugby league team players
French rugby league players
Marseille XIII players
Rugby league second-rows
XIII Catalan players
Tarbes Pyrénées Rugby players
Stade Rochelais players